The Niya ruins, is an archaeological site located about  north of modern Niya Town on the southern edge of the Tarim Basin in modern-day Xinjiang, China. The ancient site was known in its native language as Caḍ́ota, and in Chinese during the Han Dynasty as Jingjue (Old Chinese tseng-dzot, similar to  Caḍ́ota). Numerous ancient archaeological artifacts have been uncovered at the site.

Niya was once a major commercial center on an oasis on the southern branch of the Silk Road in the southern Taklamakan Desert. During ancient times camel caravans would cut through, carrying goods from China to Central Asia.

History
In Hanshu, an independent oasis state called Jingjue, generally thought to be Niya, is mentioned:

Niya became part of Loulan Kingdom by the third century. Towards the end of the fourth century it was under Chinese suzerainty. Later it was conquered by Tibet.

Excavations

In 1900, Aurel Stein set out on an expedition to western China and the Taklamakan Desert. In Niya he excavated several groups of dwellings, and found 100 wooden tablets written in 105 CE. These tablets bore clay seals, official orders and letters written in Kharoshthi, an early Indic script, dating them to the Kushan empire, or to Gandharan migrants influenced by Kushan and Indian bureaucratic traditions. Other finds include coins and documents dating from the Han dynasty, Roman coins, an ancient mouse trap, a walking stick, part of a guitar, a bow in working order, a carved stool, an elaborately-designed rug and other textile fragments, as well as many other household objects such as wooden furniture with elaborate carving, pottery, Chinese basketry and lacquer ware.  Aurel Stein visited Niya four times between 1901 and 1931.

Official approval for joint Sino-Japanese archaeological excavations at the site was given in 1994. Researchers have now found remains of human habitation including approximately 100 dwellings, burial areas, sheds for animals, orchards, gardens, and agricultural fields. They have also found in the dwellings well-preserved tools such as iron axes and sickles, wooden clubs, pottery urns and jars of preserved crops. The human remains found there have led to speculation on the origins of these peoples.

Some archeological findings from the ruins of Niya are housed in the Tokyo National Museum.  Others are part of the Stein collection in the British Museum, the British Library, and the National Museum in New Delhi.

Ancient texts included the mention and names of various regional rulers.

See also
Tarim mummies
Shanshan
Loulan Kingdom
Charklik
Dandan Oilik
Miran

Notes

http://history.yale.edu/sites/default/files/files/hansen-religious-life-niya.pdf

External links
Finding Niya artifacts
Niya Maps on Toyo Bunko Digital Silk Road Project

Former populated places in Xinjiang
Archaeological sites in China
Sites along the Silk Road
Oases of China
Major National Historical and Cultural Sites in Xinjiang
Central Asian Buddhist sites
Hotan